Miranova proga A is a women's World Cup technical ski course in Slovenia, on Pohorje mountain in Radvanje District, Maribor hostin Golden Fox (Zlata lisica) competition since 1978. 

Part of Mariborsko Pohorje Ski Resort, the largest ski course in Slovenia, the slope is divided on upper part (GS start – Trikotna jasa) and lower part (SL start – Snow stadium finish).

World Cup

History 
In 1978, competition moved from the upper "Old F.I.S" ("stara F.I.S"), incredibly steep and even too demanding slope at the top station next to Bellevue Hotel to the new slope in valley, direct into the city.

The Old slope was narrow with difficult access for a live audience, which had difficulty watching and standing on dangerous and icy steep inclines, with a small finish area. 

For the next five years (1979, 1980, 1981, 1982, 1983) competition was again, and for the last time, moved to the  upper old FIS slope, due to lack of snow and warm weather.

In 1984, competition returned on this slope permanently, often with replacements in Kranjska Gora (1988, 1991, 2007, 2012, 2014, 2018, 2020, 2021) due to snow.

In 1987, the "Snow Stadium" (finish area) was bulldozed and completely redone; the terrain was lifted and flattened for easier access and more comfortable standing.

In 1994, Urška Hrovat won Saturday's replaced slalom in front of home crowd of 30,000, with a total attendance of 50,000 over three days. Real Fox fur trophy was awarded for the last time, due to animal rights controversy.

In 1995, Vreni Schneider won the record 6th Golden Fox trophy award and record 7th individual win. Slalom as first WC event ever, was split in two days due to rain, with 1st run on Sunday and 2nd on Monday.

In 1996, two giants slaloms (first replaced Lake Louise) and slalom visited 40,000 people in three days. Saturday's GS set women's World Cup TV ratings record with 17.6 million viewers in total.

In 1997, a new Arena hotel opened in the finish area and Urška Hrovat took Golden Fox Trophy. Juan Antonio Samaranch, the president of International Olympic Committee was among the spectators.

For the first time, the OC put the Golden Fox on the internet, something new for the World Cup. In two days, the Golden Fox page had over 1500 contacts from all over the world.

In 1998, Golden Fox was cancelled – the only time in its history without being replaced (in Kranjska Gora or any other venue).

In 1999, Slovenia hosted speed disciplines for the first and only time in history of World Cup, which should be on schedule on New Year's Day, but rescheduled on the next day.

In 2005, Tina Maze won first giant slalom in history of this competition, with a total attendance of 20,000 for two days. In 2009, Maze won her second giant slalom in Maribor, with an attendance of 15,000 over two days. By the analysis of INFRONT media group, Golden Fox had over 200 million TV viewers in total, the most watched World Cup broadcast of the season, both men and women, beating even Kitzbühel. 187 million in footages (69 stations and 77 hours). Live broadcast was seen by a total of 21 million people (6 million have seen giant slalom and 15 million slalom).

In 2013, Maze took her third win here by taking slalom in front of 19,000 people. She also won the Golden Fox trophy as the third Slovenian after Mateja Svet and Urška Hrovat. And over 40,000 people attended in two days.

In 2021, they decided to prepare and build additional slope on higher altitude on crossing, combined and widened with existing upper part of the slope, due to unstable weather conditions and lack of snow in the valley. The new reserve start will be at the top of famous ex Habakuk lift, continued by right side bypassing Luka cabin, then going lower to Špelca log, then joining existing upper GS slope, widening lower part cutting the forest, ending with finish area at Trikotna jasa (traditional slalom start).

Golden Fox 

All but yellow labeled counted for traditional Zlata Lisica (Golden Fox) fur trophy, the best combined time of SL and GS.

Course name confusion 
Many terms (lifts and slopes have different names) appears for this course which is a bit misleading:
"Miranova proga A" – is a 2200 metres long WC slope, beginning at top of old Habakuk lift, passing upper GS part and lower SL part and to the finish area (Snow Stadium).
"Radvanje" – is the name of the Maribor dictrict with 8,000 inhabitants below the finish area (Snow Stadium) and also the old 2-seated same name chairlift parallel to World Cup Slalom slope.
"Snow Stadium" – Snežni stadion is the flat World Cup finish area surrounded with two hotels, restaurant and multi purpose event den. It is popular gathering place with bottom Radvanje 2-seated chairlift. 
"Pohorje 2" – is a non existing term in the vocabular and official ski resort map legend. It appears only on FIS official result lists site as the name for giant slalom slope, as mentioned, you can't find it anywhere else.
"Habakuk" – is the first resort lift opened in 1951 (at first 1-seated chairlift, then surface, now removed), named after Bugbear that "lives" in Pohorje and nearby farm. Also the same named hotel in the valley opened in 1974.

Club5+ 
In 1986, elite Club5 was originally founded by prestigious classic downhill organizers: Kitzbühel, Wengen, Garmisch, Val d’Isère and Val Gardena/Gröden, with goal to bring alpine ski sport on the highest levels possible.

Later, over the years, other classic long-term organizers joined the now named Club5+: Alta Badia, Cortina, Kranjska Gora, Maribor, Lake Louise, Schladming, Adelboden, Kvitfjell, St.Moritz and Åre.

Course sections 
Habakuk, Luka Cabin, Trikotna jasa, Snežni stadion, Arena

References

External links 
 

Alpine skiing in Slovenia
Skiing in Slovenia